Salome is the first full-length studio album from American rock band Marriages. The record was released on April 7, 2015 by Sargent House. The album was named after Salome, a mythical character from The Bible. It was recorded in February 2014 at The Hobby Shop, Highland Park, Los Angeles, and the group's first release to feature drummer Andrew Clinco. Fred Sablan (Marilyn Manson, Queen Kwong) also appeared as a guest musician on the record. Upon release, the album received "generally favorable reviews" from music critics.

Track listing

Personnel
Salome album personnel adapted from AllMusic.

Emma Ruth Rundle - guitar, vocals 
Greg Burns - bass, keyboards
Andrew Clinco - drums, percussion, guitar
Fred Sablan - guitar
Tom Biller - engineer
Jeff Bond - mixing
Heba Kadry - mastering
Sonny Kay - layout

References

External links

2015 debut albums
Marriages (band) albums
Sargent House albums